The 2013 Oregon State Beavers football team represented Oregon State University during the 2013 NCAA Division I FBS football season. The team was led by head coach Mike Riley, in his eleventh straight season and thirteenth overall. Home games were played at Reser Stadium in Corvallis, and they were members of the North Division of the Pac-12 Conference. The Beavers defeated the Boise State Broncos 38–23 in the Hawaii Bowl to end the season with a 7–6 record.

Schedule

Game summaries

Eastern Washington

This was only the third time ever that an AP-ranked FBS program was beaten by an FCS program.

Hawaii

Utah

San Diego State

Colorado

Washington State

California

Stanford

USC

Arizona State

Washington

Oregon

Boise State (Hawaii Bowl)

Rankings

Roster

Awards
Junior wide receiver Brandin Cooks won the 2013 Fred Biletnikoff Award as the nation's top college receiver. He set Oregon State records for career receiving touchdowns (23), single season touchdown receptions (15), single season receptions (120) and single season yards (1,670).

References

Oregon State
Oregon State Beavers football seasons
Hawaii Bowl champion seasons
Oregon State Beavers football